Larry Bernard (born April 16, 1967) is a Canadian professional ice hockey scout, and a former left winger.

Bernard played 140 games in the International Hockey League (IHL) and 69 games in the American Hockey League (AHL). Bernard also won the Southern Hockey League championship with the Huntsville Channel Cats, in the league's only year of existence.

Bernard was an eighth-round draft pick of the New York Rangers in the 1985 NHL Entry Draft.

Bernard is a former player-coach of the Utica Bulldogs of the then-Colonial Hockey League. Bernard then coached at the junior hockey level with the Prince George Spruce Kings, Prince George Cougars, Prince Albert Raiders and Sarnia Sting. After being an amateur scout for the Tampa Bay Lightning, Bernard became a scout with the Rangers in 2015.

References

External links

1967 births
Living people
Canadian ice hockey left wingers
Ice hockey people from British Columbia
New York Rangers scouts
Sportspeople from Prince George, British Columbia
Tampa Bay Lightning scouts
New York Rangers draft picks